The Irwin County Courthouse is located in Ocilla, Georgia.  It was made out of blond brick in the Neoclassical style at a cost of $52,000.  It has a domed clock tower with four hooded clocks.  Additions have been made to the rear side.  Some interior walls are marble and painted plaster.  Floors are made of wood, tile, carpet, and marble.

It was added to the National Register of Historic Places in 1980.

References

External links
 

Courthouses on the National Register of Historic Places in Georgia (U.S. state)
National Register of Historic Places in Irwin County, Georgia
Neoclassical architecture in Georgia (U.S. state)
Government buildings completed in 1910
Buildings and structures in Irwin County, Georgia
County courthouses in Georgia (U.S. state)